Valter Kaaver (also Valter Kaver; 14 April 1904 Võru – 16 August 1946 Donetsk, Ukrainian SSR) was an Estonian politician. He was a member of the IV Riigikogu, representing the Estonian Workers' Party.

References

1904 births
1946 deaths
People from Võru
People from Kreis Werro
Estonian Workers' Party politicians
Communist Party of Estonia politicians
Members of the Riigikogu, 1929–1932
Estonian emigrants to the Soviet Union
Estonian people who died in Soviet detention
People who died in the Gulag